Vicenta Ndongo (born 23 February 1968) is a Spanish actress. She earned early public recognition for her role in Airbag.

Biography 
Born on 23 February 1968 in Barcelona, she is of Equatoguinean descent. She graduated in acting from the Barcelona's Institut del Teatre. Some of her early film credits include a performance in the 1995 Catalan-language film  (1995) and that of Vanessa in Airbag (1997), which earned her public recognition. She also featured in Los lobos de Washington (1999) and No News From God (2001).

She landed roles in Cesc Gay's films In the City (2003) and V.O.S (2009), for which she earned a CEC Medal nomination for Best Supporting Actress, also starring alongside Alex Brendemühl in the 2007 drama .

In 2022, she joined the cast of the streaming series Días mejores.

Filmography 

Television

References 

Actresses from Barcelona
21st-century Spanish actresses
Spanish film actresses
Spanish television actresses
Spanish stage actresses
1968 births
Living people